On April 7, 2021, six people, including two children, were shot and killed at a house in Rock Hill, South Carolina, United States. Phillip Adams, a former National Football League player, was named as the perpetrator. 

On April 8, 2021, the York County Sheriff's Office said in a press conference that the perpetrator was Adams, confirmed by his father Alonzo Adams. A spokesperson for the York County Sheriff's Office said that the perpetrator had been identified and they were in the process of searching his home. Police also said they believed no other perpetrators were involved. According to the coroners' office, Adams subsequently shot and killed himself with a .45-caliber handgun.

Shooting 
Police received 911 calls starting about 4:45 p.m. EDT. A neighbor called after hearing gunshots, as did the manager of a repair company, who said that two of his employees had been shot. Responding police officers found two repairmen in the yard of the home, one of them dead. Police found evidence at the scene that tied Adams to the shooting.

Around 9:00 p.m. EDT, police surrounded Adams' parents' house. They then spent several hours negotiating with Adams, and sent in a robot to scan the house. Adams' parents were evacuated from the house, and police found Adams dead inside. Police found both a .45-caliber handgun and a 9 mm gun inside the house.

Victims 
The fatally shot victims included 70-year-old Dr. Robert Lesslie, his wife, Barbara, their two grandchildren, and a man working outside the house at the time. A sixth victim and fellow worker was critically injured in the shooting and was flown to a Charlotte hospital afterwards. He died on April 10.

Lesslie was a prominent local doctor who founded two urgent care centers. He wrote a weekly medical column for The Charlotte Observer and was an author of medical advice books. He and his wife were known for their community service and charity. The Lesslie and Adams families were neighbors.

Response 
Adams had no prior criminal record. His father, Alonzo, suggested that football may have played a role in the shooting, stating in an interview with WCNC-TV that the sport "messed him up". President Joe Biden mentioned the shooting in a speech about gun reform on April 8. On April 9, researchers at Boston University announced they would be studying Adams' brain. On December 14, 2021, an autopsy revealed that Adams suffered from an "unusually severe" case of the brain disease chronic traumatic encephalopathy.

Notes

References

2021 mass shootings in the United States
2021 murders in the United States
April 2021 crimes in the United States
April 2021 events in the United States
Attacks in the United States in 2021
Mass murder in the United States
Mass shootings in South Carolina
Mass shootings in the United States
Murder–suicides in South Carolina
Murdered American children
Mass murder in 2021
National Football League controversies
Shooting